Hage G. Geingob High School is a high school in Windhoek, the capital of Namibia. Named after the first Namibian prime minister and  president Hage Geingob, this public school was established in 2001 and has grades from 8–12.

The school has 32 teachers, three institutional workers, one bus driver, two administrators and 912 students. Situated in the heart of the Katutura township, the school caters mostly for learners from an economically disadvantaged background. These are children from the informal settlements in the outskirts of the capital. Hage Geingob High School was among the best performing schools in Khomas Region in 2017.

References 

Schools in Windhoek
2001 establishments in Namibia
Educational institutions established in 2001